The 2010 Asian Men's Junior Handball Championship (12th tournament) took place in Tehran from July 23 – August 1. It acts as the Asian qualifying tournament for the 2011 Men's Junior World Handball Championship.

Draw

* Following the IOC decision to suspend the NOC of Kuwait which came in force on 1 January 2010, the International Handball Federation decided to suspend handball in Kuwait in all categories.

Preliminary round

Group A

Group B

Placement 5th/6th

Final round

Semifinals

Bronze medal match

Gold medal match

Final standing

References

Iranian Handball Federation
www.handball.jp

Handball
Handball
Asia
Asian Handball Championships